Angus Ronald Macdonald (1901–2 May 1970) was a Canadian businessman and politician. Macdonald was a Progressive Conservative party member of the House of Commons of Canada. He was born in Frasers Mills, Nova Scotia and became a retail merchant by career.

He was first elected at the Antigonish—Guysborough riding in the 1957 general election. After serving his only federal term, the 23rd Canadian Parliament, Macdonald left federal politics and did not seek re-election.

External links
 

1901 births
1970 deaths
Canadian merchants
Members of the House of Commons of Canada from Nova Scotia
Progressive Conservative Party of Canada MPs